Wu Ran (born April 4, 2005 in Guangxi, China) is a Chinese artistic gymnast. She is the 2022 Asian champion in the team, balance beam, and floor exercise. She was the alternate for the Chinese team at the inaugural Junior World Championships.

Junior career

2019 
Wu was selected as an alternate for China at the inaugural Junior World Championships. The team won the silver medal behind Russia.  She next competed at the Chinese National Youth Games where she placed fifth on both balance beam and floor exercise.

Senior career

2022 
At the Asian Championships Wu helped team China win gold.  Individually she also won gold on balance beam and floor exercise.

Competitive history

References

External links 
 

Chinese female artistic gymnasts
2005 births
Living people
Gymnasts from Guangxi
Medalists at the Junior World Artistic Gymnastics Championships
21st-century Chinese women